Bankhead railway station served the isolated settlement of Bankhead, east of Carstairs Junction in South Lanarkshire, Scotland from 1867 to 1945 on the Dolphinton branch.

History 
The station opened in November 1867 by the Caledonian Railway. To the north was a goods yard with one siding. A signal box was built in 1887 which closed in 1934. The station closed on 12 September 1932 but reopened on 17 July 1933, only to close again on 4 June 1945.

References

External links 

Disused railway stations in South Lanarkshire
Railway stations in Great Britain opened in 1867
Railway stations in Great Britain closed in 1932
Railway stations in Great Britain opened in 1933
Railway stations in Great Britain closed in 1945
1867 establishments in Scotland
1945 disestablishments in Scotland
Former Caledonian Railway stations